Salzgitter (Eastphalian: Soltgitter) is an independent city in southeast Lower Saxony, Germany, located between Hildesheim and Braunschweig. Together with Wolfsburg and Braunschweig, Salzgitter is one of the seven Oberzentren of Lower Saxony (roughly equivalent to a metropolitan area). Salzgitter originated as a conglomeration of several small towns and villages, and is today made up of 31 boroughs, which are relatively compact conurbations with wide stretches of open country between them. The main shopping street of the young city is in the borough of Lebenstedt, and the central business district is in the borough of Salzgitter-Bad. The city is connected to the Mittellandkanal and the Elbe Lateral Canal by a distributary. The population of the City of Salzgitter has exceeded 100,000 inhabitants since its foundation in 1942 (which made it a city in contrast to a town by the German definition), when it was still called Watenstedt-Salzgitter. Beside Wolfsburg, Leverkusen and Eisenhüttenstadt, Salzgitter is one of the few cities in Germany founded during the 20th century.

History of the name
Until 31 March 1942, "Salzgitter" was the name of a town where the borough Salzgitter-Bad now is. From then until 1951, "Salzgitter" was the name of a borough of the city Watenstedt-Salzgitter that existed at the time. In 1951, the borough Salzgitter was renamed Salzgitter-Bad; the name Salzgitter, having thus been freed up, became the new and more succinct name of the city that had been called "Watenstedt-Salzgitter" until then. (Nowadays, "Salzgitter-Watenstedt" is the name of a small borough with a few hundred inhabitants.)

Geography
Salzgitter is located in a wide dell coated with loess, between the Oderwald Forest and the Salzgitter-Höhenzug ("Salzgitter Hills"). The highest point is the hill Hamberg, located northwest of Salzgitter-Bad.

Neighbouring municipalities
The following cities, towns and municipalities, listed clockwise beginning in the northeast, border on the city of Salzgitter. (As Salzgitter was founded on the area of the district of Wolfenbüttel, that district borders on Salzgitter in the west and in the east and is therefore listed twice.)

Braunschweig (independent city)
in the Landkreis Wolfenbüttel: City of Wolfenbüttel, Cramme, Flöthe (both belonging to Samtgemeinde Oderwald), Gielde (Samtgemeinde Schladen)
in the Landkreis Goslar: Liebenburg, Wallmoden, Samtgemeinde Lutter am Barenberge
in the Landkreis Wolfenbüttel: Sehlde, Haverlah, Elbe, Baddeckenstedt, Burgdorf bei Salzgitter (all Samtgemeinde Baddeckenstedt)
in the Landkreis Hildesheim: Söhlde
in the Landkreis Peine: Lengede, Vechelde

City structure

The area of the City of Salzgitter consists of 31 boroughs (often called villages): Bad, Barum, Beddingen, Beinum, Bleckenstedt, Bruchmachtersen, Calbecht, Drütte, Engelnstedt, Engerode, Flachstöckheim, Gebhardshagen, Gitter, Groß Mahner, Hallendorf, Heerte, Hohenrode, Immendorf, Lebenstedt, Lesse, Lichtenberg, Lobmachtersen, Ohlendorf, Osterlinde, Reppner, Ringelheim, Salder, Sauingen, Thiede, Üfingen and Watenstedt.

These 31 boroughs are combined to 7 towns. Each town has an elected mayor and town council.

The towns with their boroughs are:
Town North: Lebenstedt, Salder, Bruchmachtersen, Engelnstedt
Town Northeast: Thiede, Beddingen, Üfingen, Sauingen
Town Northwest: Lichtenberg, Osterlinde, Reppner, Lesse
Town East: Hallendorf, Bleckenstedt, Drütte, Immendorf, Watenstedt
Town South: Bad, Gitter, Groß Mahner, Ringelheim, Hohenrode
Town Southeast: Flachstöckheim, Barum, Beinum, Lobmachtersen, Ohlendorf
Town West: Gebhardshagen, Calbecht, Engerode, Heerte

History, 1300–1982
Salzgitter originated in the beginning of the 14th century around salt springs near the village Verpstedt (later Vöppstedt). The name was derived from the neighbouring village Gitter (nowadays a city borough) as "up dem solte to Gytere", which means "salt near Gitter"; the first mention was in 1347. After 200 years of salt production at various springs, the peasants in the area which is nowadays Salzgitter were chartered around 1350, but lost municipal law again when being transferred to the Duchy of Brunswick-Lüneburg in the beginning of the 16th century. Later, Salzgitter belonged to the diocese of Hildesheim. When the diocese was transferred to Prussia in 1803, the municipal law was reconfirmed, but taken away once more in 1815, when Salzgitter became part of the Kingdom of Hanover. In 1830, a brine bath was established in Salzgitter.

After the Kingdom of Hanover was transferred to Prussia in 1866, Salzgitter became a Prussian municipality, which was chartered again in 1929. Prior to that, the towns Vorsalz and Liebenhall had been incorporated (in 1926 and 1928, respectively). Salzgitter now belonged to the Landkreis (district) of Goslar and included, apart from Salzgitter itself, also some small settlements like Gittertor, which is nowadays part of Salzgitter-Bad. In 1936, Kniestedt was incorporated; it is also part of Salzgitter-Bad now.

Due to the large iron ore body in Salzgitter, which had been mentioned first in 1310, the National Socialists founded the "Reichswerke Hermann Göring" for ore mining and iron production in 1937. In order to facilitate an unobstructed development of the smelting works, a unique administration structure in the whole area was conceived. Therefore, it was decreed in the Order about the area settlement around the Hermann-Göring-Werke Salzgitter, effective from 1 April 1942, to form a unified city district (independent city). Towards this aim, the town of Salzgitter and the municipalities Beinum, Flachstöckheim, Groß-Mahner, Hohenrode, Ohlendorf and Ringelheim (7 in total, all belonging to the Landkreis Goslar) and Barum, Beddingen, Bleckenstedt, Bruchmachtersen, Calbecht, Drütte, Engelnstedt, Engerode, Gebhardshagen, Hallendorf, Heerte, Immendorf, Lebenstedt, Lesse, Lichtenberg, Lobmachtersen, Osterlinde, Reppner, Salder, Thiede-Steterburg (nowadays simply Thiede) and Watenstedt (21 in total, all belonging to the Landkreis Wolfenbüttel) were merged to form the Stadtkreis Watenstedt-Salzgitter. As the neighbouring municipality Gitter had already been incorporated in 1938, the young city initially comprised 29 boroughs in 1942. Together with the remainder of the district of Goslar, the new independent municipality was integrated into the Free State of Brunswick. In return, Braunschweig transferred the Landkreis Holzminden to the Prussian Province of Hanover. In October, 1942, the SS established the Drütte concentration camp, a subcamp of the Neuengamme concentration camp, to provide slave labour for the Hermann Göring Works. This large subcamp held 2,800 inmates. There were three concentration camps located in Salzgitter. During the war, Salzgitter was severely damaged by several American and British bombings. After the war, the State of Braunschweig became part of the Land Lower Saxony, and Watenstedt-Salzgitter became an Independent City in the "Administrative District of Braunschweig" (later Regierungsbezirk Braunschweig).

In 1951, the city was renamed to "Stadt Salzgitter" (City of Salzgitter), while the borough Salzgitter was renamed to "Salzgitter-Bad", referring to the brine bath there. In the course of the local administrative reform of Lower-Saxony effective from 1 March 1974, the municipalities Üfingen and Sauingen (formerly Landkreis Wolfenbüttel) were incorporated, increasing the number of boroughs to 31. Iron ore continued to be mined in Salzgitter until 1982; in the former mine Schacht Konrad (Konrad mine), an ultimate disposal place for radioactive waste has been planned since 1975.

Modern history

Population development
Population figures in order to the then area, i.e. until 1942 the contemporary quarter Salzgitter-Bad and from 1942 on the Independent City Watenstedt-Salzgitter and Salzgitter respectively.

Religions
The area of the modern city of Salzgitter originally pertained to the diocese of Hildesheim. In 1568, the Reformation was established in Salzgitter, and two ecclesiastical superintendencies came into existence: the southern part of the area of the modern city, the Superintendency of Salzgitter, pertained to the Province of Hanover and thus ecclesiastically to the Evangelical Lutheran State Church of Hanover (and, within it, to the Consistory of Hildesheim); the northern part (the Superintendency of Lebenstedt), however, belonged to the Free State of Brunswick and therefore to the Evangelical Lutheran State Church in Brunswick.

When the city of Watenstedt-Salzgitter was created in 1942, the entire area was attached to the state of Brunswick both politically and ecclesiastically. Thus, all parishes of Salzgitter now belong to the Church of Brunswick. The two superintendencies are called Propstei (provostry) today, and both the Propsteien Salzgitter-Bad and Salzgitter-Lebenstedt comprise additional parishes which are not within the city of Salzgitter.

Roman Catholics who after the Reformation moved into the city belonged, as in the Middle Ages, to the diocese of Hildesheim, which established a separate deanery in Salzgitter. All Roman Catholic parishes of the city now pertain to that deanery.

Besides the two major denominations, there are congregations in Salzgitter which belong to free churches. These include a Baptist parish, the Church of God, Plymouth Brethren, and the Seventh-day Adventist Church, as well as several New Apostolic Churches.

Due to the immigration of foreign workers during the 1970s, there are some Islamic mosques. According to calculations based on census data, Salzgitter in 2011 had the highest proportion of Muslim migrants of all major cities in Lower Saxony.

Politics
After the creation of Salzgitter a state commissar was set in place as provisional Mayer of the city of Watenstedt-Salzgitter. After World War II, the military government of the British zone of occupation installed the communal constitution of Britain. Furthermore, there is an elected Council in place. The Council elects one of its members to Mayor (German: Oberbürgermeister) as leader and representative of the city. Besides, since 1946 on there was the Oberstadtdirektor as the Chief Executive of the City Council. Since 2001, the office of the leader of the Council and the Chief Executive are merged into one, simply called Mayor. Being elected by the people, he represents the city and leads the Council.

Coat of arms

Salzgitter's Coat of Arms consists of a silver furnace visible behind a silver pinnacle wall on which there is a buckler whose upper ground is green and adorned with two saltern instruments and whose lower ground is gold and adorned with a black sledge and black iron. On the red ground behind the furnace, there are two wheaten ears.

The Coat of Arms stands for the agriculture, which is important for many villages of Salzgitter, on the one hand, and for the industry, which led to Salzgitter's foundation, on the other hand.

This Coat of Arms is from 1951. Before, Watenstedt-Salzgitter had got a different one. Also the former town Salzgitter had got various coats of arms from 1854 on.

Like many German cities, Salzgitter has used the city's logo for some years. It is a green field with a white snaking way that narrows towards the horizon.

Transport

Road
In the north of Salzgitter, there is an Autobahn (A 39) from Braunschweig to the interchange Salzgitter (where it is possible change to Autobahn 7 Kassel-Hanover). Salzgitter has got five grade-separated interchanges to this Autobahn. East from Salzgitter, there is the Autobahn 395 (Braunschweig-Goslar), which can be reached from Salzgitter by four interchanges.
Moreover, two highways go through Salzgitter.

Railway
Salzgitter has six railway stations. The most important one is in the quarter Salzgitter-Ringelheim, the most central one in Salzgitter-Lebenstedt. There is no Hauptbahnhof (main railway station) in Salzgitter. Salzgitter-Ringelheim's station is located on the Halle (Saale)-Goslar-Salzgitter-Hildesheim-Hanover line. Another line leads into the Harz Mountains and to Braunschweig, passing Salzgitter-Bad. Salzgitter-Lebenstedt is the end of a local line coming from Braunschweig and passing the other train stops of Salzgitter.

Public transport
There are three bus companies in Salzgitter. The bus network is quite important considering Salzgitter consists of many spread-out villages.

Economy and infrastructure

Media
In Salzgitter, the daily newspaper Salzgitter-Zeitung and the Sunday newspaper Salzgitter-Woche am Sonntag are published. There is the event calendar Salzgitter Szene and the online magazine Salzgitter-aktuell. Furthermore, the local TV channel TV 38 is broadcast by cable television.

Important companies in Salzgitter

 Alstom Transport
 Salzgitter AG (which had once been the Hermann-Göring-Werke)
 Volkswagenwerk Salzgitter
 Schaper & Brümmer
 MAN
 Robert Bosch GmbH
 SMAG
 IKEA built its biggest storehouse in Salzgitter

Public institutions
Salzgitter is seat of these public institutions:
Bundesamt für Strahlenschutz, the Federal Radiation Protection Office of Germany, founded in 1989
Central Registration Office of the State Judiciary Administration of Lower-Saxony

Education
Since 1993, there is a site of the Fachhochschule Braunschweig-Wolfenbüttel, where you can study
Logistics and transport management
Logistics and information management
economical engineering/Traffic management
Tourism management
Sport management
Media design.
In addition, you can study after having completed a study in the past
Multimedia
and – by correspondence course –
Quality and environment management
Sale management.

The other sites of the Fachhochschule are Braunschweig, Wolfenbüttel and Wolfsburg.

Furthermore, there are several general-education schools (meaning that general knowledge is taught there in contrast to occupation-specific knowledge) and vocational schools, among them three grammar schools, the Gymnasium Salzgitter-Bad, the Gymnasium am Fredenberg and the Kranich-Gymnasium, the latter two located at Salzgitter-Lebenstedt.

For education outside school, there is the Volkshochschule Salzgitter with sites in Salzgitter-Bad and in Salzgitter-Lebenstedt.

Culture and sights

Libraries
There are three public libraries in Salzgitter. The main-library is located in Salzgitter-Lebenstedt (155,000 media) with branch-libraries in Salzgitter-Bad (42,000 media) and Salzgitter-Fredenberg (25,000 media).

Theatre
There is no theatre in Salzgitter nor any building used as one. Yet there are several representations at various places.
For example, in Salzgitter-Bad there is a society rooting in the students' theater of the local grammar-school that supports the amateur play. They act on various stages, with an auditory between 100 and 600 people. Furthermore, there are irregular performances of musicals.

Museums
Städtisches Museum Schloss Salder ("Municipal Museum Salder Castle"), free entry, 3500+ sqm of permanent exhibitions about geology, prehistory, history of the city and its region (e. g. about an ichthyosaur, the neanderthals of Lebenstedt, Salzgitter iron ore mining and processing), overall featuring 3000+ exhibits, each year additional special expositions, an outdoor area with technical objects, a working windmill, the ice age path with life-size animal models of mammoth and more.
Städtische Kunstsammlungen Schloss Salder ("Municipal Art Collection in Salder Castle")

Buildings
In the quarter Salzgitter-Lebenstedt:
City monument (Turm der Arbeit – "Tower of work", the city's emblem, constructed in 1995. The monument tells about the suffering of the forced workers and Nazi concentration camp prisoners while building up industry during the national socialism, about the flight from home beyond the rivers Oder and Neisse, about the fight against the removal of the iron works and about Salzgitter's people's will to live and to rebuild.)
Town hall (built 1959–1963)
Ice sports hall (in far-east style)
In the quarter Salzgitter-Bad:
Old Town
Thermalsolbad ("hot-springs brine bath")
Protestant church St. Mariae Jacobi; military defence church built in 1481
Catholic church St. Marien
Former Nicolai church (nowadays event room)
Salzgitter Bismarck Tower
Former town hall at the market place
Tilly house
farm house in Kniestedt (now care for old people and music school)
"Beamtensiedlung" (from 1930, dwellings of the employees of the smelting works)
pilgrimage church in Salzgitter-Engerode, chapel built in 1236, one of Lower-Saxony's oldest pilgrimage churches with frescos laid open
Wasserburg (castle), Salzgitter-Gebhardshagen, nearly 1000 years old
Franzosenbrücke ("French bridge", stone arch bridge over the river Innerste near Salzgitter-Hohenrode
Salzgitter-Lichtenberg: Castle ruins, once built by Henry the Lion, destroyed in 1552 and laid open again in the 1950s. Look-out and restaurant.
Salzgitter-Ringelheim: Ringelheim Castle, former monastery, founded in the 10th century, secularised in 1803. Baroque church built in 1694, including a precious organ; crucifix from the workshop of Bishop Bernward of Hildesheim (around 1000); large castle park (Schlosspark)
Salzgitter-Salder: Salder Castle with Municipal Museum, former emblem of the city; the castle built in the style of the "Weser renaissance" around 1600 was domicile of the noble family von Salder in the Duchy of Braunschweig, later domain of the duke; nowadays museum of local history; castle church Maria-Magdalena with a circular floor plan.
Salzgitter-Thiede: Convent Steterburg, ladies' convent founded in 1003; there are still buildings from the 11th century. The house of the abbess was built in 1691. The church is from 1752. In 1938, the area was reconstructed to tenements.

Other sights

archeological excavation from the Stone Age in Salzgitter-Lebenstedt
Farm house Salzgitter-Flachstöckheim with open-air stage and English Park (1756/1821)
Salzgittersee ("Lake Salzgitter") in Salzgitter-Lebenstedt, beach, water-ski, boats, inliners, diving

Regular events
May: municipal sports week in Salzgitter-Lebenstedt
May: museum festival in Salzgitter-Salder
May/June: Schützenfest (German festival of a shooting club including shooting matches) in Salzgitter-Bad
June/July: Altstadt-Festival (a festival in the old town centre of Salzgitter-Bad) in Salzgitter-Bad

Twin towns – sister cities

Salzgitter is twinned with:
 Imatra, Finland (1970)
 Swindon, United Kingdom (1975)
 Créteil, France (1980)
 Stary Oskol, Russia (1987)
 Gotha, Germany (1988)

Notable people

Friedrich Schlemm (1795–1859), physician and anatomist
Heinrich Ahrens (1808–1874), philosopher
August Jäger (1808–1848), writer
Hermann Lattemann (1852–1894), professional airspeaker and parachute jumper
Wilhelm Wassmuss (1880–1938), diplomat
Hagen Stehr (born 1941), German-Australian tuna breeder and entrepreneur
Wolfgang Matz (1944–1995), footballer
Hans-Joachim Gehrke (born 1945), ancient historian
Harald Weiss (born 1949), composer and director
Wolfgang Dremmler (born 1954), footballer
Peter Lux (born 1962), footballer and coach
Şebnem Dönmez (born 1974), German-born Turkish actress
Okan Patirer (born 1979), Turkish actor
Henrik Stehlik (born 1980), trampoline gymnast
Daniel Theis (born 1992), basketball player
Christian Zwarg (born 1968), audio engineer and mastering engineer

See also
Metropolitan region Hannover-Braunschweig-Göttingen-Wolfsburg

References

External links

 
Website of the Fachhochschule Braunschweig-Wolfenbüttel
Website of the Salzgitter AG (owning the iron works)
Website of the SMAG GmbH
Website of the Volkswagen work Salzgitter

 
Cities in Lower Saxony
Populated places established in 1942
1942 establishments in Germany